Cardinal Records was a jazz record label founded in 1920 in New York that published the first recordings by Ethel Waters. The following year, it began releasing material from the catalogue of Gennett Records.

References

American record labels
Jazz record labels